John Hopton (died 1558) was a 16th-century Roman Catholic Bishop of Norwich.

He was a member of the Dominican Order by 1516, in Oxford. He was educated at the University of Bologna in Italy and at Oxford University, where he took a doctorate in theology.

During the reign of Edward VI, Hopton was Chaplain to the Lady Mary, later Queen Mary I, and was summoned before the Privy Council in 1549 and ordered to stop celebrating the Catholic Mass.

When Mary acceded to the throne, Hopton was appointed Bishop of Norwich, and was consecrated on 28 October 1554. John Foxe, in his Acts and Monuments described him, with Michael Dunning, the "bloody chancellor" of Norwich, as a ruthless persecutor of Protestants, "in such sort, that many of them he perverted, and brought quite from the truth, and some from their wits also". Hopton and Dunning were mainly responsible for the burning of 31 Protestants in Norwich during their tenure.

Hopton died in December 1558, and he is buried in Norwich Cathedral.

1558 deaths
Bishops of Norwich
16th-century English Roman Catholic bishops
English chaplains
Catholic chaplains
Year of birth unknown
Burials at Norwich Cathedral